Philip Andrew Traynor (May 31, 1874 – December 5, 1962) was an American dentist and politician from Wilmington, in New Castle County, Delaware. He was a member of the Democratic Party and served two terms as U.S. Representative from Delaware.

Early life and family
Traynor was born in Wilmington, Delaware. He attended the public schools, Goldey Business College, in Wilmington, and the University of Delaware at Newark. He graduated in 1895 from the dental department of the University of Pennsylvania at Philadelphia, and began the practice of dentistry in Wilmington.

Professional and political career
Traynor was a member of the Delaware board of dentistry from 1918 until 1943, serving as its chairman after 1922. He was also vice president and member of the board of trustees of Ferris Industrial School for Boys from 1938 until 1942. He was elected to the U.S. House of Representatives in 1940, defeating incumbent Republican U.S. Representative George S. Williams. He lost his bid for a second term in 1942 to Republican, Earle D. Willey, but in a 1944 rematch defeated Willey, and returned to the U.S. House. Finally, he lost his bid for a third term to Republican J. Caleb Boggs, a New Castle County lawyer, and war veteran. Traynor served in the Democratic majority in the 77th and 79th Congress. He was in office from January 3, 1941 until January 3, 1943, and again from January 3, 1945 until January 3, 1947, during the administrations of U.S. Presidents Franklin D. Roosevelt and Harry S. Truman.

Death and legacy
Traynor died at Wilmington, and is buried in the Cathedral Cemetery there.

Almanac
Elections are held the first Tuesday after November 1. U.S. Representatives take office January 3 and have a two-year term.

References

External links
Biographical Directory of the United States Congress 
Delaware and U.S. History

Political Graveyard

Places with more information
Delaware Historical Society; website; 505 North Market Street, Wilmington, Delaware 19801; (302) 655-7161
University of Delaware; Library website; 181 South College Avenue, Newark, Delaware 19717; (302) 831-2965
Newark Free Library 750 Library Ave., Newark, Delaware (302) 731-7550.

1874 births
1962 deaths
People from Wilmington, Delaware
American dentists
University of Pennsylvania School of Dental Medicine alumni
Goldey–Beacom College alumni
Democratic Party members of the United States House of Representatives from Delaware